Thomas Richter (born 29 June 1967 in Hof) is a German football coach and a former player.

Honours
 Bundesliga: 1990–91

References

1967 births
Living people
German footballers
German football managers
1. FC Kaiserslautern players
1. FC Kaiserslautern II players
Hertha BSC players
SV Waldhof Mannheim players
SV Eintracht Trier 05 players
Bundesliga players
2. Bundesliga players
Association football midfielders